Göran Bertil David Bexell (born 24 December 1943 in Högsby, Sweden) is a Swedish professor in ethics. Between 2003 and 2008, he served as the rector of Lund University.

References 

Academic staff of Lund University
1943 births
Living people
Rectors of Lund University